Hieronim Barczak (born September 27, 1953 in Poznań) is a Polish footballer most noted for his captaincy of Lech Poznań. He was also capped 8 times for Poland national football team in 1980. Barczak was generally a left defender.

His football career started in 1967 at Polonia Poznań, before moving to Lech Poznań, for which he played fourteen seasons, most of it with an honour of team's captain. He played in 367 matches (including 167 consecutive appearances), scoring one goal, the former of which is still a club record. Upon completion of these fourteen seasons, he moved to FF Södertälje in 1986, before his retirement from professional football in 1988.

References

1953 births
Living people
Polish footballers
Lech Poznań players
Ekstraklasa players
Poland international footballers
Footballers from Poznań
Association football defenders
Polish expatriate footballers
Expatriate footballers in Sweden
Polish expatriate sportspeople in Sweden